Calotes nigrilabris, the black-cheek lizard, is an agamid species endemic to Sri Lanka. It can be distinguished easily from painted-lipped lizard by having black bar on mouth rather than white or orange bar.

Distribution
This species is tolerably common at localities such as Nuwara Eliya, Pattipola, Ohiya, Horton Plains, and Adam's Peak

Description
Head is one and a half times width. A row of spines above and at the back of tympanum. Adult male is with swollen cheeks. Gular sacs are not developed. Mid body scale rows are 42–50. Ventrals are larger than dorsals. 
Dorsum is green unpatterned or with black edged, cream transverse bars or eye-like spots. Head with black markings. Venter is pale green.

Ecology
This species is largely arboreal, inhabiting tree trunks, hedges, and shrubs, where it hunts for insects and worms by day. In Horton Plains C. nigrilabris can be found residing on the gorse bushes (Ulex europeus) and Rhododendron leaves to hunt the insect prey (particularly bees) that gets attracted to the flowers.

Reproduction
Lays up to 4 eggs, measuring 17–23 mm in length and 10–13 mm in width. Hatchlings have mean SVL of 35–50 mm. Two breeding seasons can be observed from November–December and February to March. Hatchlings can be observed following the egg laying in the breeding months after an approximate two months of incubation.

References

External links
https://www.academia.edu/1400803/Calotes_nigrilabris_Peters_1860_Reptilia_Agamidae_Draconinae_a_threatened_highland_agamid_lizard_in_Sri_Lanka
http://www.wildreach.com/reptile/Sauria/Calotes%20nigrilabris.php
https://web.archive.org/web/20140928094724/http://www.srilankanreptiles.com/TetrapodReptiles/Agamidae.html

Calotes
Reptiles of Sri Lanka
Endemic fauna of Sri Lanka
Articles containing video clips
Reptiles described in 1860
Taxa named by Wilhelm Peters